The 2011 AFC Cup was the eighth edition of the AFC Cup, a football competition organized by the Asian Football Confederation (AFC) for clubs from "developing countries" in Asia.

Allocation of entries per association
2 teams to qualify from each of the following associations:
 Hong Kong
 Iraq
 Jordan
 Kuwait
 Lebanon
 Maldives
 Oman
 Syria
 Vietnam
 Yemen
1 team to qualify from each of the following associations:
 Bahrain (withdrew and replaced by a team from  Uzbekistan)
 India
 Thailand
4 invited teams, from the following associations:
 Indonesia
 Iraq
 Singapore
 Uzbekistan
5 losers from the 2011 AFC Champions League qualifying play-offs (including any of the 2010 AFC Cup finalists which fail to fulfil the criteria set by AFC to compete in the 2011 AFC Champions League, and thus directly enter the 2011 AFC Cup)

Qualifying teams

The following is the list of participants confirmed by the AFC. There were 28 direct entries while 4 teams joined as losers of the 2011 AFC Champions League qualifying play-offs.

1 Invited to play in the competition.

2 Al-Qadsia failed to fulfil the criteria set by AFC to compete in the 2011 AFC Champions League, and so directly enter the 2011 AFC Cup.

3 Replaced Al-Ahli (2009–10 Bahrain First Division League champions).

Schedule
Schedule of dates for 2011 competition.

Group stage

The draw for the group stage was held in Kuala Lumpur, Malaysia on 7 December 2010. Clubs from the same country may not be drawn into the same group. The winners and runners-up of each group advanced to the knockout stage.

Group A

Group B

Group C

Group D

Group E

Group F

Group G

Group H

Knockout stage

Round of 16
Based on the results from the group stage, the matchups of the round of 16 were decided as below. Each tie was played in one match, hosted by the winners of each group (Team 1) against the runners-up of another group (Team 2).

Quarter-finals
The draw for the quarter-finals, semi-finals, and final was held in Kuala Lumpur, Malaysia on 7 June 2011. In this draw, the "country protection" rule was applied: if there are exactly two clubs from the same country, they may not face each other in the quarter-finals; however, if there are more than two clubs from the same country, they may face each other in the quarter-finals.

Semi-finals

Final 

The final of the 2011 AFC Cup was hosted by one of the finalists, decided by draw.

Awards
The following awards were given for the 2011 AFC Cup:
Most Valuable Player Award:  Artur Gevorkyan (Nasaf Qarshi)
Top Scorer:  Ivan Bošković (Nasaf Qarshi)
Fair Play Award:  Nasaf Qarshi

Statistics

Top goalscorers

Own goals

See also
2011 AFC Champions League
2011 AFC President's Cup

References

External links
AFC Cup Official Page 

 
2
2011